The mixed pair competition in aerobic gymnastics at the 2001 World Games in Akita was played from 17 to 18 August. The aerobic gymnastics competition took place at Akita City Gymnasium.

Competition format
A total of 8 teams entered the competition. Only final was held.

Results

References

External links
 Results on IWGA website

Mixed pair